The New South Wales Government Railways (NSWGR) was the agency of the Government of New South Wales that administered rail transport in New South Wales, Australia, between 1855 and 1932.

Management
The agency was managed by a range of different commission structures between 1857 and 1932, which reported to either the Minister for Public Works or the Minister for Transport.

The inaugural Chief Commissioner was Ben Martindale and, following the enactment of the  he became Commissioner of Railways. John Rae succeeded Martindale in 1861, and in 1877 Charles Goodchap was appointed Commissioner. The  set up a corporate body of three railway commissioners to manage the railways and remove them from political influence, resulting in the resignation of Goodchap.

This Board of Railway Commissioners of New South Wales was in place from 22 October 1888 to 4 April 1907, and was replaced by a sole Chief Commissioner of Railways and Tramways until 22 March 1932, when a panel arrangement was restored for a period of nine months, with the Transport Commissioners of New South Wales. On 29 December 1932, the Department of Railways New South Wales was established and Thomas Joseph Hartigan was appointed Commissioner for Railways replacing the functions of the Chief Transport Commissioner. The Department of Railways New South Wales become the official name of the railway and was used on most documentation (drawings & other paperwork), the NSWGR title was still used periodically on public documentation such as advertising and timetables. This continued until the creation of the Public Transport Commission on 20 October 1972. The last Commissioner for Railways was Neil McCusker.

Executives

Chief Commissioner for Railways and Tramways

Chief Transport Commissioner

Legacy
Further restructures in 1996, 2001 and 2003 resulted in the establishment of the RailCorp, the agency currently responsible for the Sydney suburban and interurban rail network and rural passenger services, and for providing government and commercial freight operators with access to the rails of the Sydney metropolitan area. On 1 July 2013, the operational responsibilities of RailCorp were transferred to NSW TrainLink and Sydney Trains.

Infrastructure

Rolling stock
In 1936, the company owned 1187 locomotives, 457 railcars, 1445 coaches, 172 brake vans, 22.068 goods wagons.

See also
Rail transport in New South Wales

Notes and references

Former government railways of Australia
Railways
Railway companies established in 1855
Railway companies disestablished in 1915
Railway companies of New South Wales
1915 disestablishments in Australia
History of transport in New South Wales
1855 establishments in Australia